Rateau or Râteau may refer to:

People
 Armand-Albert Rateau (1882-1938), French furniture maker and interior designer
 Auguste Rateau (1863–1930), French engineer
 Jean-Pierre Rateau (1800–1887), French lawyer and politician
 Michel Rateau (born 1938), French composer
 Robert Rateau (born 1975), Mauritian international footballer

Other
 Le Râteau, mountain in the French Alps